Oleksandr Mykolayovych Agarin (born on 24 June 1973) is a Kyrgyzstani and Ukrainian footballer who is a defender for FC Naftovyk-Ukrnafta Okhtyrka. He is a member of the Kyrgyzstan national football team.

External links
Player profile – ffu.org.ua
Player profile – klisf.info

1973 births
Living people
Ukrainian footballers
Kyrgyzstani footballers
Kyrgyzstan international footballers
Kyrgyzstani expatriate footballers
Expatriate footballers in Ukraine
FC Alga Bishkek players
FC Dnipro Cherkasy players
FC Naftovyk-Ukrnafta Okhtyrka players
FC Volyn Lutsk players
FC Vorskla Poltava players
Ukrainian Premier League players
People from Kara-Balta
Kyrgyzstani people of Ukrainian descent
Ukrainian expatriate sportspeople in Kyrgyzstan
Association football defenders